Paul Zimmerman or Paul Zimmermann may refer to:

Paul Zimmerman (sportswriter) (1932–2018), American sportswriter
Paul Zimmerman (politician) (born 1958), Dutch-born Hong Kong environmentalist
Paul D. Zimmerman (1938–1993), American screenwriter, film critic, and activist
Paul Zimmermann (SS officer) (1895–1980), German SS-Brigadeführer
Paul Zimmermann (blacksmith) (born 1939), German blacksmith who created contemporary forge work
Paul Zimmermann (mathematician) (born 1964), French computational mathematician

See also
 Paul Zimmer (disambiguation)